Cam Boy is a Canadian television drama series, which premiered in 2021 on OutTV. Created by Thom Fitzgerald, the series stars Callum Dunphy as Aston, a young gay man in Nova Scotia who turns to performing for internet cam sex sites to make money during the COVID-19 pandemic in Canada.

The cast also includes Samuel Davison, David Light, Julien Galipeau, Craig Chester, Scott Bleu, Tony Nappo, Zack Currie, Tyler Riordon, Joey Beni, Sharleen Kalayil, Jordan Poole, Loretta Yu, Joshua Mood, Eugene Sampang, Teo Ferguson and Brenda Fricker.

The series was greenlit by OutTV in 2020, and premiered on April 30, 2021. In July 2021, OutTV announced that it had commissioned a second season.

References

External links

2020s Canadian LGBT-related drama television series
2021 Canadian television series debuts
OutTV (Canadian TV channel) original programming
Television shows set in Nova Scotia
Television shows filmed in Nova Scotia